The Torneo de Córdoba, officially named Torneo de Primera División, is an annual rugby union competition in Argentina. The tournament involves clubs affiliated to the Córdoba Rugby Union (UCR), and is one of several regional competitions held in Argentina every year.

The 2019 edition is named "Enrique Rudy Schmal" in honour of a former president of the UCR, died in 2018.

Format
The tournament is contested by 11 clubs, 8 from the last Primera División season plus the 3 best placed teams of Torneo de Ascenso in the previous season. Teams are split into two zones, where they play each other in a single round-robin format. The four best placed teams of each zone qualify for the "Súper 8" tournament, while the rest of the teams play a promotion and relegation playoff.

Champion and runner-up of Torneo de Córdoba qualify for the Nacional de Clubes, the main club competition of Argentina while the other best placed teams qualify for Torneo del Interior, the national club competition outside Buenos Aires.

List of championships
Since 1931, all the champions year-by-year:

Notes:

Titles by club

References

External links
 

Rugby union leagues in Argentina
Sports leagues established in 1931
1931 establishments in Argentina